The I'm Your Baby Tonight World Tour was a concert tour by American pop/R&B singer Whitney Houston, in support of her multi-platinum album I'm Your Baby Tonight. Prior to Houston performing two dates in Japan early-March, the official tour started on April 18, in North America. Houston's performed nearly 100 concert dates throughout 1991 in North America and Europe.

Background
After a successful series of concerts in Japan during March 1991, Houston returned to the United States to prepare for the world tour to support the four-times platinum selling album of the same name. Houston was initially planned to start the tour in the U.K. However, due to the Gulf War, the European leg was rescheduled until the fall. Houston instead started the tour in the US. Houston kicked things off with her "Welcome Home Heroes Concert" on March 31 in Norfolk Virginia. The special, which aired on HBO, was dedicated to the troops who were fighting in the Gulf War. All proceeds went to the Red Cross. The summer of 1991 was considered one of the worst touring seasons ever. Many big names were cancelling dates and playing to low capacities. Houston was no exception. The singer played to low attendances and even cancelled some dates due to poor ticket sales. Experts cited the ongoing recession and financial crisis as the main reason. During the summer, Houston also developed a throat ailment. As a result, the singer was forced to cancel the end of her Canadian tour to rest her voice.

The tour resumed in late August when Houston reached the U.K. She played 10 consecutive dates at Wembley Arena in London, surpassing her own record of 9 straight dates at the same arena during the Moment of Truth World Tour, in 1988.

A month and a half after the tour concluded in Paris, October 1991, Houston would begin production on her first feature film, The Bodyguard in December.

The show
Unlike her previous tours, the shows had more focus on visuals. The stage was lit by 300 lights spinning and flashing in synch with the music. The state of the art system was designed by Mark Fisher and Jonathan Park. The system had only been used previously by Pink Floyd in his "The Wall" show in Berlin and the Rolling Stones' "Urban Jungle Tour". Houston also incorporated costume changes during her sets for the first time. She often wore skin tight jump suits. Houston also took part in choreographed dancing with backup dancers. Unlike her previous tours, the stage was not in the round. She was backed by a seven piece band. After her previous musical director John Simmons died, bass player Rickey Minor became the tour's musical director. R&B group After 7 opened during the North American leg. Dance act Snap! supported her on the European leg.

Houston reworked most of the songs during the show with improvisations and spontaneity, adding funk to the uptempos while slowing down the ballads. According to the Minneapolis Star Tribune, "Saving All My Love for You" was "sultry, taking excursions through the church and jazz world that aren't heard on the recorded version." She incorporated her popular love songs into a "Love Medley", giving her time to try out the newer uptempo/new jack swing numbers on her current album. Midway through the shows, Houston introduced her band while singing the gospel "Revelation". This started the gospel set which included a cappella and solos from her backup singers. Her brother Gary Houston also performed a Marvin Gaye medley. With hip hop music becoming popular during the time, Houston incorporated rappers into the show. Rappers were given verses during "How Will I Know" while shouting "yo Whitney yo" throughout other songs. During some of the shows, Houston incorporated her hit "All The Man That I Need" into a medley with the Billie Holiday classics "Lover Man (Oh Where Can You Be?)" and "My Man", which she dedicated to her own man at the time. At the time, Houston was rumored to be dating singer Bobby Brown. The rumor of course turned out to be true. The Holliday cover earned praise from many critics. The Vancouver Sun said "her delivery was achingly soulful" and that the singer should continue towards that direction musically. For some of the US dates, she performed her top ten pop hit "Miracle". Houston ended her show with "I'm Your Baby Tonight" before the encore, "Greatest Love of All", in Europe for some of the London, UK dates included the encore "I Belong to You".

Some criticized Houston for focusing on the MTV trend of relying on dancing and big production lighting. The Sun Sentinel noted that the singer should opt for smaller venues and theaters that are "far more suitable to her sophistication and talent." USA Today praised the singer because she "shakes the confinements of her recordings' calculated productions and gets downright gutsy and soulful"

Opening acts
 After 7 (USA—Leg)
 Snap! (European—Leg)
 D'Influence (Glasgow Scotland)
 Gerald Alston (European—Leg, select dates)

Setlist
"I Wanna Dance with Somebody (Who Loves Me)"
"So Emotional"
"Saving All My Love for You"
"How Will I Know"
"All at Once" / "A House Is Not a Home" / "Didn't We Almost Have It All" / "Where Do Broken Hearts Go"
"Billie Holiday Medley: Lover Man (Oh, Where Can You Be?)" / "My Man"
"All the Man That I Need"
"Mercy Mercy Me (The Ecology)" / "What's Going On" (performed by Gary Houston)
"My Name Is Not Susan"
"Anymore"
"Miracle" 
"Revelation" (contain excerpts of "He's Got the Whole World in His Hands" and "He's All Right")
"Sack Full of Dreams" (performed by Gary Houston) 
"In Return"
"This Day"
"Who Do You Love"
"I'm Your Baby Tonight"
"I Belong to You"
"Greatest Love of All"

Notes

Additional notes
March 14 and 15: in Yokohama, Japan, Houston performed a stirring rendition of CeCe Winans "In Return". 
May 11: her performances of "My Name Is Not Susan", "Miracle" and "Greatest Love of All" at her Oakland, California concert were shown during a televised telethon that aired on MTV, May 12, for The Simple Truth: A concert for Kurdish Refugees.
September 29: the concert in A Coruña, Spain was recorded and aired on TV in several markets of Spain, and select countries in Europe.

Shows

Festivals and other miscellaneous performances
Summerfest

Cancellations and rescheduled shows

Personnel
Band
Musical Director – Ricky Minor
Bass guitar, bass synthesizer – Ricky Minor
Guitar – Ray Fuller
Keyboard: Michael Bearden
Drums – Ricky Lawson
Keyboard – Bette Sussman
Saxophone – Kirk Whalum
Keyboard – Kevin Lee
Percussion – Bashiri Johnson
Background vocalists – Gary Houston, Vonchita Rawls, Carmen Rawls, Tiawana Rawls
Choreography
Choreographer – Khandi Alexander
Dancers
Diesko Boyland, Bryant Cash-Welch, Jonathan Webbe, Luca Tommassini
Tour Management
Manager – Tony Bulluck

External links
 i'm your baby tonight tour - whitneyhouston

References

1991 concert tours
Whitney Houston concert tours